Niue requires its residents to register their motor vehicles and display vehicle registration plates. Current plates are New Zealand standard 360 mm × 125 mm, smaller in height and width than Australian plates, and use New Zealand stamping dies, as zeroes now have a slash through them (e.g. 52Ø9).

References

Niue
Transport in Niue
Niue-related lists